Machine Fish is the third studio album from heavy metal band Galactic Cowboys and their first for Metal Blade Records. The album is heavier, more straightforward, and less progressive than their previous release. Cornerstone praised Ben Huggins' vocals, stating that his voice "scrapes across your ears with an intensity usually reserved for those being eaten alive by great white sharks."

Notes
The artwork depicts a "machine fish", which is actually a garbage sculpture made by bassist Monty Colvin, complete with turning indicator light bulbs for eyes.
The song "Red Sun" actually dates back to 1989. Versions of the song were recorded for the self-titled album and Space In Your Face, but a re-worked version of the song made the cut for Machine Fish.
The Japanese version of this album contained the bonus track "It's Raining (Again)".

Track listing

Personnel

Ben Huggins - Vocals, guitar
Wally Farkas - Guitar, vocals, keys
Monty Colvin - Bass, vocals 
Alan Doss - Drums, vocals, keys

References

External links
Machine Fish lyrics

1996 albums
Galactic Cowboys albums